1995 in television may refer to:

1995 in American television
1995 in Australian television
1995 in Austrian television
1995 in Belgian television
1995 in Brazilian television
1995 in British television
1995 in Canadian television
1995 in Croatian television
1995 in Chinese television
1995 in Danish television
1995 in Dutch television
1995 in French television
1995 in German television
1995 in Irish television
1995 in Israeli television
1995 in Italian television
1995 in Japanese television
1995 in New Zealand television
1995 in Norwegian television
1995 in Philippine television
1995 in Portuguese television
1995 in Scottish television
1995 in South African television
1995 in Spanish television
1995 in Swedish television
1995 in Taiwanese television